This page documents confirmed tornadoes from May to July 2020 via various weather forecast offices of the National Weather Service. Based on the 1991–2010 averaging period, 276 tornadoes occur across the United States throughout May, 243 in June, and 143 in July. The climatological peak for tornadic activity in the country, May features a risk area that is concentrated throughout the U.S. Great Plains, especially in the states of Texas, Oklahoma, and Kansas. This is a shift from earlier months where the highest concentration of tornadoes is focused around the U.S. Gulf Coast. Historical data shows a substantial drop in the number of violent (EF4+) tornadoes in May versus April, likely due to the loss of the amplified winter jet stream, and perhaps as a result of tornadoes tracking over more sparsely populated areas. However, intense tornadoes are still possible in any month of the year. Tornado activity in June typically shifts more north and west across the Plains, especially Northern Colorado and the Texas Panhandle. Tornado activity in July normally affects the Northern Plains and the Great Lakes.

May 2020 proved to be one of the least active on record, with only 126 confirmed tornadoes. No moderate- or high-risk outlooks were issued by the Storm Prediction Center throughout the month, a first since archives of outlooks began in 2002. June was even less active, with only 91 confirmed tornadoes. In addition, no EF2+ tornado was confirmed during June, this first time this had occurred since records began 1950. However, July saw its first violent tornado since 2004. June and July also saw several tornadoes coming from tropical cyclones.

Tornado counts listed below are considered preliminary until final publication in the database of the National Centers for Environmental Information.

United States yearly total

May

May 3 event

May 4 event

May 5 event

May 8 event

May 12 event

May 13 event

May 14 event

May 15 event

May 16 event

May 17 event

May 18 event

May 19 event

May 20 event

May 21 event

May 22 event

May 23 event

May 24 event

May 25 event

May 26 event

May 27 event

May 28 event

May 29 event

May 30 event

June

June 1 event

June 2 event

June 4 event

June 6 event
Florida events associated with Tropical Storm Cristobal.

June 7 event
Florida events associated with Tropical Storm Cristobal.

June 8 event

June 9 event
Illinois and Ohio event associated with Tropical Storm Cristobal.

June 10 event

June 13 event

June 17 event

June 18 event

June 19 event

June 20 event

June 21 event

June 22 event

June 24 event

June 26 event

June 27 event

June 28 event

July

July 1 event

July 2 event

July 4 event

July 6 event

July 7 event

July 8 event

July 10 event

July 11 event

July 12 event

July 14 event

July 15 event

July 16 event

July 17 event

July 18 event

July 19 event

July 20 event

July 21 event

July 22 event

July 23 event

July 24 event

July 25 event
Tornadoes in Texas were associated with Hurricane Hanna.

July 26 event
Tornadoes were associated with Hurricane Hanna.

July 29 event

See also
 Tornadoes of 2020
 List of United States tornadoes in April 2020
 List of United States tornadoes from August to September 2020

Notes

References 

2020-related lists
Tornadoes of 2020
Tornadoes
Tornadoes
Tornadoes
2020 natural disasters in the United States
Tornadoes in the United States